Opuntia macrorhiza is a common and widespread species of cactus with the common names plains pricklypear or prairie pricklypear or western pricklypear. It is found throughout the Great Plains of the United States, from Texas to Minnesota, and west into the Rocky Mountain states to New Mexico, Utah, and perhaps Idaho, with sporadic populations in the Mississippi and Ohio Valleys. It is also reported from northern Mexico in the states of Chihuahua, Sonora, Coahuila, Nuevo León, Durango, Tamaulipas, and San Luís Potosí., though all Arizona and Mexican records should be considered with caution due to confusion with other similar species.  The species is cultivated as an ornamental in other locations.

The species prefers well-drained, sandy or gravelly soils, mostly in grassland areas. It is one of the shorter species of the genus, rarely over 30 cm (1 foot) tall, spreading horizontally and forming wide clumps. Flowers are showy and bright yellow, often with red markings near the base of the petals. Fruits are narrow, red, juicy and edible.

Subdivisions
Some subspecies and varieties have proposed within the species. None are accepted by Plants of the World Online , which treats Opuntia macrorhiza subsp. pottsii (Salm-Dyck) U.Guzmán & Mandujano and Opuntia macrorhiza var. pottsii (Salm-Dyck) L.D.Benson as the separate species Opuntia pottsii.

References

External links
Opuntia macrorhiza photo gallery at Opuntia Web

macrorhiza
Cacti of the United States
Cacti of Mexico
Desert fruits
Edible plants
Plants described in 1850